

The LFG V 13 Strela (named for the Strelasund off Rügen) was a seaplane airliner produced in small quantities in Germany in the early 1920s. It was a conventional, three-bay biplane with an enclosed cabin for four passengers. The original design featured twin pontoons, but a landplane version was developed as the V 130.

The V 13s were operated by Luft-Fahrzeug on its Hamburg-Stettin-Danzig and Stettin-Swinemünde-Stralsund routes. These services were later shared by V 13s operated by Luftverkehr Pommern and later were absorbed into Deutsche Luft Hansa. In Norway, Norske Luftruter operated two second-hand V 13s until the late 1920s.

Specifications (V 13)

Notes

References
 
  
 German aviation between 1939-1945

1920s German airliners
Floatplanes
LFG aircraft
Single-engined tractor aircraft
Biplanes